For Summer Olympics women's football tournaments, Asian Football Confederation (AFC) holds Asian qualifying tournaments since 2004 tournament.

From 2004 tournament to 2024, top two teams are to qualify (excluding the berth for the hosts if the Olympic is held in an Asian country).

History
Women's football is introduced to Olympics since 1996, but until 2000 the participating teams were determined by the results of preceding FIFA Women's World Cup. Since 2004, continental confederations (including AFC) are to hold qualifying tournaments.

Format
Formats differ by the tournaments. See the pages of each qualifying tournaments for details.

Results
Flags for the qualifying tournaments indicate the hosts of the final rounds;  indicates the final round was held in various places.

See also
 Summer Olympics women's football tournaments

References

External links
Women's Olympic Games, the-AFC.com

 
Olympic
Football qualification for the Summer Olympics